A radionuclide cisternogram is a medical imaging study which involves injecting a radionuclide by lumbar puncture (spinal tap) into a patient's cerebral spinal fluid (CSF) to determine if there is abnormal CSF flow within the brain and spinal canal which can be altered by hydrocephalus, Arnold–Chiari malformation, syringomyelia, or an arachnoid cyst. It may also evaluate a suspected leak (also known as a CSF fistula) from the CSF cavity into the nasal cavity. A leak can also be confirmed by the presence of beta-2 transferrin in fluid collected from the nose before this more invasive procedure is performed.

The patient may be instructed to not eat or drink, or take medications such as aspirin or other blood thinners before the procedure. Pledgets can be inserted into the nasal cavity before the procedure when a CSF leak is suspected.

The patient's spinal fluid is injected with a radiopharmaceutical tracer, such as DTPA tagged with indium 111, through a lumbar puncture (spinal tap). The tracer will diffuse up the spinal column and into the intracranial ventricles and the subarachnoid spaces around the brain. The progress of the tracer's diffusion through the CSF will be recorded by a nuclear medicine gamma camera. Images are usually taken immediately, at 6 hours, and at 24 hours. The patient may be asked to return for 48- and 72-hour follow-up scans.

The pledgets will be removed and either imaged with a gamma camera or counted using a gamma counter. If the tracer has leaked onto the pledget through the skull, it will appear on the gamma camera image or register abnormal counts allowing the diagnostician to determine the location of the leak within the sinus cavity. The site of the CSF leak can be plugged with fat or muscle by endoscopic surgery.

Headaches following the procedure are common, but should fade in 3–5 days. Drinking caffeinated liquids, as well as bed rest, is often recommended, though at least one scientific paper disputes the practice.

References

External links
eMedicine entry on CSF leaks
2002 paper disputing caffeine as a cure for CSF headaches
Information for DTPA In-111

Neuroimaging
CSF tests